Ocotea rotundata is a species of evergreen tree in the genus of plants Ocotea, in the family Lauraceae. It is endemic to Ecuador.  Its natural habitat is subtropical or tropical moist montane forests.

References

rotundata
Endemic flora of Ecuador
Trees of Ecuador
Vulnerable flora of South America
Taxonomy articles created by Polbot